John Brassil (born 19 March 1963) is a former Irish Fianna Fáil politician who served as a Teachta Dála (TD) for the Kerry constituency from 2016 to 2020. 

He gained the Fianna Fáil nomination in 2015, ahead of former North Kerry TD Tom McEllistrim, who lost his seat at the 2011 general election. As Norma Moriarty, Fianna Fáil's other candidate in Kerry was based in the south of the constituency, Brassil held the monopoly in a traditionally Fianna Fáil region of North Kerry.

Brassil was appointed by Micheál Martin as the Fianna Fáil junior spokesperson on primary care and community health services. He is a pharmacist by profession. He was a member of Kerry County Council from 1999 to 2016 for the Listowel local electoral area. He lost his seat at the general election in February 2020, to his party colleague Norma Foley.

References

External links
John Brassil's page on the Fianna Fáil website

1963 births
Living people
Fianna Fáil TDs
Local councillors in County Kerry
Members of the 32nd Dáil